Keerati Bualong is a Thai sailor. In 2012, he became the first Thai to qualify for the Olympics in the men's one person dinghy, the same class of boat His Majesty The King of Thailand once sailed. He competed at the 2012 Summer Olympics in the Men's Laser class.

While harsh conditions proved overwhelming for the Thai sailor who did not do as well as expected, Keerati, 20, has already caught the attention of the international sailing community and is expected to achieve great things over the next ten years of his sailing career. A three-year plan to ensure his qualification and better results at the 2016 Olympics in Brazil is now coming together, the hunt for corporate sponsors to supplement funding by the Sports Authority of Thailand and the Yacht Racing Association of Thailand underway.

Keerati was the first Asian to win the Laser Radial Youth Worlds and has many medals to his name.

Medals 
Gold Medals:

Asian Sailing Championships 2012 (Laser Standard)

South East Asian (SEA) Games 2011 (Laser Radial)

Asian Games 2010 (Laser Radial)

Asia Pacific Laser Championships 2010 (Laser Standard)

Laser Radial Youth World Championship 2009 (Laser Radial)

Byte CII Asian Championship 2009 (Byte CII)

Byte CII Asia Pacific Championship 2009 (Byte CII)

Byte CII Open World Championship 2007 (Byte CII)

Silver Medals:

Volvo Youth Sailing ISAF World Championship 2010 (Laser Radial)

Bronze Medals:

Asian Beach Games 2008 (Laser 4.7)

References

Year of birth missing (living people)
Living people
Keerati Bualong
Keerati Bualong
Sailors at the 2012 Summer Olympics – Laser
Asian Games medalists in sailing
Sailors at the 2010 Asian Games
Sailors at the 2014 Asian Games
Sailors at the 2016 Summer Olympics – Laser
Medalists at the 2010 Asian Games
Keerati Bualong
Keerati Bualong
Keerati Bualong
Keerati Bualong
Southeast Asian Games medalists in sailing
Sailors at the 2018 Asian Games
Competitors at the 2011 Southeast Asian Games
Competitors at the 2019 Southeast Asian Games